Gema Switzerland, based in St. Gallen, is an international supplier of electrostatic powder coating equipment. The products range from manual coating to fully automated powder coating. Since 2012, Gema has been a part of the Graco Group, a worldwide supplier of liquid conveyance systems and components.

History 
Gema was founded in 1897 by Viktor Gehrig, who was joined in 1907 by Gottlieb Mannhart in Walenstadt, Switzerland, as a metalworking company. Soon after its relocation to St. Gallen in the 1950s, Gema began operating in the electrostatic powder coating industry. In 1971, Gema's research department was the first to successfully integrate the generation of high voltages into a spraying gun.

As of 2014, seven affiliated companies (located in Germany, the UK, Italy, France, the US, China and Japan), along with a broad network of international distributors in more than 60 countries, sell the products to a wide range of industrial users.  The Gema units and equipment are developed and manufactured in the headquarters in St. Gallen. 

Gema Switzerland exhibits its products at international trade shows for industrial coating, such as Paint Expo.

Awards 
 1976: IF Product Design Award for the electrostatic powder coating device type 721. 
 2006: IF Product Design Award for the manual gun OptiFlex.
 2014: Red Dot Design Award for the automatic gun OptiGun GA03 in the category Product Design.

References

External links 
 

Manufacturing companies of Switzerland
Manufacturing companies established in 1897
Swiss companies established in 1897